Axel Verlooy (born 20 November 1963) is a Belgian equestrian. He competed in two events at the 1984 Summer Olympics.

References

External links
 

1963 births
Living people
Belgian male equestrians
Olympic equestrians of Belgium
Equestrians at the 1984 Summer Olympics
Sportspeople from Mechelen